Jeanette F. Reibman (August 18, 1915 – March 11, 2006) was an American lawyer and politician who served as a Democratic member of the Pennsylvania State Senate for the 18th district from 1969 to 1994.  She also served in the Pennsylvania House of Representatives for the Northampton County district from 1955 to 1966. She was one of only two women (along with Lisa Boscola) to have been elected to the Senate for Lehigh and Northampton counties as of 2015.

Early years and education
Fichman was born on August 18, 1915 in Fort Wayne, Indiana to Meir and Pearl Schwartz Fichman and graduated from North Side High School.  She received an A.B. degree in Political Science with minors in English and Economics from Hunter College in 1937.  She received an L.L.B degree from Indiana University School of Law-Bloomington, Indiana in 1940 and entered the bar. She received an L.L.D. degree from Lafayette College in 1969.

Career
She worked in Washington, D.C. as an attorney for the United States War Department from 1940 to 1942 and the U.S. War Production Board from 1944 to 1946.  After marrying attorney Nathan L. Reibman in 1943, she relocated with him to the Easton, Pennsylvania area to raise a family.

In 1954, the American Association of University Women recommended she run for to the Easton Area School Board and she was elected.  She soon realized that she could do more to help with Easton schools at the state level.

Reibman served as member of the Pennsylvania House of Representatives for the Northhampton County district from 1958 to 1966.  She served as a member of the Pennsylvania State Senate for the 18th district from 1969 to 1996.

Reibman also served as a trustee for Lafayette College from 1970 to 1985.

Inducted into the Indiana University Maurer School of Law Academy of Alumni Fellows in 1993, Reibman retired from her elected position with the Pennsylvania Senate in 1994, after having been reelected seven times. She received honorary degrees from Lehigh University, Wilson College, Cedar Crest College, and Moravian College.

Death and interment
Reibman died in Allentown, Pennsylvania on March 11, 2006, and was interred at the Easton Cemetery in Easton, Pennsylvania.

Legacy
An administration building on the campus of East Stroudsburg University was named in her honor in 1972 and an early childhood learning center on the campus of Northampton Community College in 1992.

References

External links
Archived version of "Memorial Service for Former Trustee Jeanette Reibman Monday in Colton Chapel", Lafayette College, March 12, 2006

1915 births
2006 deaths
20th-century American academics
20th-century American Jews
21st-century American Jews
20th-century American women lawyers
20th-century American lawyers
20th-century American women politicians
20th-century American politicians
Burials in Pennsylvania
Hunter College alumni
Indiana University Maurer School of Law alumni
Jewish American state legislators in Pennsylvania
Lafayette College alumni
Lafayette College trustees
Democratic Party members of the Pennsylvania House of Representatives
Pennsylvania lawyers
Democratic Party Pennsylvania state senators
Politicians from Fort Wayne, Indiana
Women state legislators in Pennsylvania